Pietro della Vigna (also Pier delle Vigne, Petrus de Vineas or de Vineis; Capua, ca. 1190 – Pisa, 1249) was an Italian jurist and diplomat, who acted as chancellor and secretary (logothete) to Emperor Frederick II. Falsely accused of lèse-majesté, he was imprisoned, blinded and committed suicide soon after. He appears as a character in the Inferno of the Divine Comedy by Dante Alighieri.

Life and work
Pietro della Vigna was born in 1190 in Capua, under humble circumstances and studied law at Bologna. Through his classical education, his ability to speak Latin and his poetic gifts, he gained the favour of Emperor Frederick II, who made him his secretary, and afterwards judex magnae curiae, councillor, governor of Apulia, prothonotary and chancellor. The emperor sent him to Rome in 1232 and 1237 to negotiate with the pope; to Padua in 1239 to induce the citizens to accept imperial protection; and to England in 1234–1235 to arrange a marriage between Frederick II and Isabella of England, the sister of King Henry III of England.

Della Vigna proved a skillful and trustworthy diplomat, and he persistently defended the emperor against his traducers and against the pope's menaces. But at the First Council of Lyon (1245), which had been summoned by Pope Innocent IV, della Vigna entrusted the defense of his master to the celebrated jurist Taddeo da Suessa, who failed to prevent his condemnation.

Della Vigna was a distinguished man of culture. He encouraged science and the fine arts, and contributed much to the welfare of Italy by his legislative reforms. He was also the author of some vernacular poetry, of which two canzoni and a sonnet are still extant.

His letters, mostly written in the name of the emperor and published by Iselin (Epistolarum libri vi, 2 v., Basel, 1740), contain much valuable information on the history and culture of the 13th century. A collection of the laws of Sicily, a Tractatus de potestate imperiali, and another treatise, On Consolation, in the style of Boethius, are also attributed to him.

The Guelphic tradition accuses della Vigna, as well as the emperor and his court, of heresy. It was even stated, probably without any foundation, that they were the authors of the famous work De Tribus Impostoribus, wherein Moses, Christ and Muhammad are blasphemed.

Imprisonment and supposed suicide 
Della Vigna was arrested in Cremona at the beginning of 1249 as a traitor (proditor). The reasons for the arrest have never been clarified; a conspiracy or accusation of corruption has been suggested. He was blinded by Frederick II in Pontremoli in the Piazzetta of San Geminiano. The exact circumstances of della Vigna's death, which occurred shortly after his downfall, are unknown; some sources claim that he may have been tortured to death or died as a result of being blinded, while others insist that he committed suicide.

In the Divine Comedy
As a suicide, he appears as one of the damned in the Woods of Suicide in Dante's Inferno, Circle VII, Ring II, Canto XIII: Violent against the self: suicides and profligates. Della Vigna reveals his identity to the travelers Dante and Virgil: "I am himself that held both keys of Frederick's heart / to lock and unlock and well I knew / to turn them with so exquisite an art."

Dante's portrayal of della Vigna emphasises his skill as a rhetorician. His syntax is complex and tangled, like the thornbushes. At one point, Dante echoes it: "I think he thought that I was thinking", according to John Ciardi's translation. In placing him among the suicides rather than the traitors, Dante is affirming that della Vigna was falsely or wrongly accused.

In the 19th century, William Blake illustrated the Divine Comedy and depicted della Vigne in The Wood of the Self-Murderers: The Harpies and the Suicides.

Notes

References
Huillard-Bréholles, Vie et correspondence de Pierre de la Vigne (Paris, 1864)
Presta, Pier delle Vigne (Milan, 1880)
Capasso and Ianelli, Pier delle Vigne (Caserta, 1882)

Peter de Vinea - Catholic Encyclopedia article

External links
 

Pietro della Vigna
Pietro della Vigna
People from Caserta
13th-century Italian jurists
Prothonotaries
13th-century Italian poets
Italian male poets
Vigna, Pietro della
Medieval Italian diplomats
Sicilian School poets
13th-century diplomats
13th-century Latin writers
Medieval suicides
Characters in the Divine Comedy
Court of Frederick II, Holy Roman Emperor
University of Bologna alumni
Italian letter writers
Medieval letter writers